Quacy (Barnes) Timmons (born September 26, 1976) was a professional basketball player in the WNBA, as well as leagues in other countries, such as in China, Israel, Italy, South Korea, and Turkey. After playing professionally she began her coaching career.

Indiana 
Timmons played for Indiana between 1994 and 1998. In her senior year, she was the team leader in points and rebounds, averaging 18.1 points and 6.5 rebounds. She was named to the all Big Ten first-team in 1997–98. In her final regular-season game against Michigan State she scored 29 points, tying her career high for points scored and breaking the school record for field-goal percentage hitting 12 of her 13 attempts for 92%. In 1996–97, Barnes recorded double digit scoring in 37 consecutive games.

Professional career 
Barnes was the second pick in the third round (22nd overall) and of the 1998 WNBA draft, selected by the Sacramento Monarchs. She was the first player in the history of Indiana basketball to be chosen in a WNBA draft.

Personal life
Timmons graduated from Indiana University Bloomington with a bachelor's degree in physical education. Quacy got married and changed her last name to Timmons. She has one son and 2 daughters.

Career statistics

College

WNBA

|-
| style="text-align:left;"|1998
| style="text-align:left;"|Sacramento
| 17 || 0 || 5.3 || .400 || .000 || .364 || 0.5 || 0.1 || 0.1 || 0.4 || 0.5 || 0.9
|-
| style="text-align:left;"|2000
| style="text-align:left;"|Seattle
| 31 || 23 || 22.7 || .418 || .111 || .536 || 2.7 || 1.1 || 0.6 || 1.1 || 2.0 || 6.7
|-
| style="text-align:left;"|2001
| style="text-align:left;"|Seattle
| 20 || 3 || 11.5 || .390 || 1.000 || .778 || 1.7 || 0.6 || 0.5 || 0.3 || 0.8 || 3.4
|-
| style="text-align:left;"|2002
| style="text-align:left;"|Phoenix
| 2 || 0 || 6.5 || .000 || .000 || .750 || 0.5 || 0.0 || 0.5 || 1.0 || 0.0 || 1.5
|-
| style="text-align:left;"|Career
| style="text-align:left;"|4 years, 3 teams
| 70 || 26 || 14.8 || .401 || .200 || .592 || 1.8 || 0.7 || 0.4 || 0.7 || 1.2 || 4.2

References

External links
Storm Coaching Network Q&A: Quacy (Barnes) Timmons, Eastern Illinois University

Living people
1976 births
Basketball coaches from Michigan
Basketball players from Michigan
Centers (basketball)
Eastern Illinois Panthers women's basketball coaches
Indiana Hoosiers women's basketball coaches
Indiana Hoosiers women's basketball players
People from Benton Harbor, Michigan
Phoenix Mercury players
Sacramento Monarchs players
Seattle Storm players
American women's basketball coaches
Heilongjiang Dragons players
American expatriate basketball people in China